Gorgolainis is a former municipality in the Heraklion regional unit, Crete, Greece. Since the 2011 local government reform it is part of the municipality Heraklion, of which it is a municipal unit. The municipal unit has an area of 41.458 km2. Population 2,930 (2011). The seat of the municipality was in Agios Myronas. Another village within the municipal unit is Kato Asites.

References

Populated places in Heraklion (regional unit)